I Bet You is a show about the lives of best friends and professional poker players Phil "The Unabomber" Laak and Antonio "The Magician" Esfandiari as they wandered the streets of America betting and daring each other on anything and everything that inspired them, using their own money.

The series was produced by NorthSouth Productions for the MOJO HD network. Two seasons aired on MOJO HD before the network went down on December 1, 2008; a third season was filmed but has gone unaired.

Episodes

Most episodes were centered on a big bet (referred to in the title of the episode) of which the development was shown in several pieces. Between those pieces, smaller bets around town were shown.

The first season consisted of eight regular episodes and two bonus episodes. The second season premiered on April 10, 2008 at 9:30 PM and concluded its 14 episodes on July 10.

Setting
Each episode was filmed in a different location, though usually in or around a major American city, such as New York City, Las Vegas or Miami.

DVD releases

Cast
Dealer Dolls-Poker Dealers (1 episode, 2007)
Brian Danner-Himself
Tim Weske-Himself
Antonio Esfandiari-Himself - Host (unknown episodes, 2007)
Phil Laak-Himself - Host (unknown episodes, 2007)
Melissa Pollard-Poker Dealer (unknown episodes, 2007)
Brian Wilson WSOP champion

References

External links
 I Bet You at MOJO HD
 Official MySpace Page
 

2000s American game shows
2000s American reality television series
2007 American television series debuts
2008 American television series endings